Events in the year 2013 in South Korea.

Incumbents
 President
 Lee Myung-bak (2008 – February 25, 2013)
 Park Geun-hye (February 25, 2013 – 2017)
 Prime Minister
 Kim Hwang-sik (2010 – February 26, 2013)
 Jung Hong-won (February 26, 2013 – 2015)

Events

January
 January 5: Saemaeul-ho Push-pull car was retired after 25 years in operation.

February

March
 March 20: 2013 South Korea cyberattack

April

May
 May 5: Namdaemun Gate reopens

June 

 June 13: Bangtan Sonyeondan debuted

July
 July 21: The Labor Party is founded.

August
 August 29: The Busan International Comedy Festival is founded.
 2013 South Korean sabotage plot
 The Arbeit Workers Union is founded.

September
September 5 : Gdragon releases Coup De'Tat album

October

November

December

Films

 18th Busan International Film Festival
 50th Grand Bell Awards
 34th Blue Dragon Film Awards

Music

 List of number-one hits of 2013
 List of Gaon Album Chart number ones of 2013
 List of number-one Streaming Songs of 2013
 2013 Mnet Asian Music Awards

Television

 2013 KBS Drama Awards
 2013 SBS Drama Awards
 2013 MBC Drama Awards
 6th Korea Drama Awards

Sport
 2013 in South Korean football
 2013 Korea Open
 2013 Korea Professional Baseball season
 2013 Korean Series
 2013 Korea Open Grand Prix Gold
 2013 Korean Grand Prix
 2013 3 Hours of Inje

Deaths 
Rottyful Sky (age 25), singer and actress, October 8

References 

 
2010s in South Korea
Years of the 21st century in South Korea
South Korea
South Korea